Gunbird Special Edition (Gunbird 1 & 2 in Japan) is a compilation scrolling shooter video game for the PlayStation 2 that includes the arcade versions of Gunbird and Gunbird 2. It was developed by Psikyo and published by Atlus in Japan in 2004 and by Xplosiv in Europe in 2005. New features include eight difficulty settings, an adjustable view option (letter boxed and vertical, full screen and horizontal), and the Practice Mode.

Reception
Gunbird Special Edition received generally moderately positive reviews. Retro Gamer awarded it seven stars of ten: "If you’re after a good-looking old-skool blaster, and have superhuman skills, then you'll want to show your mates exactly what you can do with this". NowGamer gave it a score of 7.7/10: "Neither game is short of bullets or personality – you just have to be prepared to look past the dated visuals". Jeuxvideo.com, however, was much more critical of the game; they scored it only 9/20 and recommended buying Gradius V instead.

References

External links
Official website
Official website 
Playstation.com entry
Gunbird Special Edition at MobyGames

2004 video games
Atlus games
Cooperative video games
PlayStation 2 games
PlayStation 2-only games
Psikyo games
Science fantasy video games
Steampunk video games
Vertically scrolling shooters
Video game compilations
Video games developed in Japan
Video games featuring female protagonists
Multiplayer and single-player video games